The Falkland Islands general election of 1971 was held on 30 November – 2 December 1971 to elect members to the Legislative Council. Four out of the ten Councillors were elected through universal suffrage, two from Stanley and one each from East Falkland and West Falkland.

Results
Candidates in bold were elected.  Candidates in italic were incumbents.

Stanley constituency

East Falkland constituency

West Falkland constituency

Notes

References

1971 elections in South America
General election
1971
Non-partisan elections
November 1971 events in South America
December 1971 events in South America
1971 elections in the British Empire